Actinochaeta is a genus of tachinid flies in the family Tachinidae.

Species
 Actinochaeta amazonica (Townsend, 1934)
 Actinochaeta carlosalbertoi (Lima, 1926)
 Actinochaeta columbiae Brauer & Bergenstamm, 1889
 Actinochaeta nigriventris (Townsend, 1934)

External links

Tachininae
Taxa named by Friedrich Moritz Brauer
Taxa named by Julius von Bergenstamm